Several places and things have this name including:

United States
Fond du Lac County, Wisconsin
Fond du Lac, Wisconsin (city)
Fond du Lac High School
Fond du Lac School District
University of Wisconsin–Fond du Lac
Fond du Lac Light, a lighthouse
Fond du Lac Dock Spiders, a baseball team in the Northwoods League
Fond du Lac River, a river in the county
Fond du Lac (town), Wisconsin
Fond du Lac County Airport
North Fond du Lac, Wisconsin (village)
Episcopal Diocese of Fond du Lac, Wisconsin
Fond du Lac County Jane Doe, unidentified homicide victim discovered in Fond du Lac County in 2008
The Fond du Lac Freeway, Wisconsin Highway 145 in Milwaukee
Fond du Lac (Duluth), Minnesota, a neighborhood
Treaty of Fond du Lac, either of two treaties made between the United States and the Ojibwe people
Fond du Lac Band of Lake Superior Chippewa, Ojibwe Indian band near Duluth, Minnesota
Fond du Lac Indian Reservation

Canada
Fond du Lac River (Mackenzie River)
Fond-du-Lac Airport
Fond-du-Lac, Saskatchewan town and reserve in Saskatchewan

Rivers
Fond du Lac River (disambiguation)